CoopVoce is an Italy-based Mobile Virtual Network Operator (MVNO) launched on June 1, 2007 by the owner Coop Italia and based on TIM GSM/GPRS network.

External links
 

Mobile phone companies of Italy
Mobile virtual network operators